Caryocolum splendens is a moth of the family Gelechiidae. It is found in Iran.

The length of the forewings is about 5 mm. The forewings are dark brown mottled with white and light brown. There are white markings mixed with fuscous. Adults have been recorded on wing in early July.

References

Moths described in 1977
splendens
Moths of Asia